The 1972 Torneo Godó or Trofeo Conde de Godó was a men's tennis tournament that took place on outdoor clay courts in Barcelona, Spain. It was the 19th edition of the tournament and was part of the 1972 Grand Prix circuit. It was held from 16 October until 23 October 1972. Fifth-seeded Jan Kodeš won the singles title.

Finals

Singles
 Jan Kodeš defeated  Manuel Orantes 6–3, 6–2, 6–3

Doubles
 Juan Gisbert /  Manuel Orantes defeated  Frew McMillan /  Ilie Năstase 6–3, 3–6, 6–4

References

External links
 ITF tournament edition details
 Official tournament website
 ATP tournament profile

Barcelona Open (tennis)
Torneo Godo
Torneo Godo
Torneo Godo